3D Viewer (formerly Mixed Reality Viewer and before that, View 3D) is a 3D computer graphics viewer and augmented reality application that was first included in Windows 10 1703. It supports the .fbx, .3mf, .obj, and .stl  and many more file formats listed in features section.

On the first launch, 3D Viewer automatically loads a "Bee.glb" file and renders an animated wasp, not a bee, on a gray background. Users can change the viewing angle, select and watch one of the available animations (defined in the 3D file) or adjust either of the 3 light sources. The light setup can be saved as "themes" and applied to other 3D objects quickly. The app also features four "Quick Animations". These are ways in which the app can showcase the 3D object by changing the viewing angle. For example, the "Turntable" item rotates the viewpoint around the object latitudinally. If the device running the app is equipped with a camera, the app can create a mixed reality experience that will allow you to tap on a surface you are viewing, and the 3D model will drop onto that surface.  It will then make a rudimentary attempt at SLAM in order to keep the object in place.

3D Viewer can post a file to the Remix 3D website, open it in Paint 3D, or send it to the Print 3D app (formerly 3D Builder) for 3D printing.  When in Mixed Reality mode, the 3D Viewer can also capture photos and videos of the scene that has your 3D model augmented into it.

3D Viewer is no longer included with the operating system as of Windows 11, but can still be downloaded from the Microsoft Store.

See also
3D Movie Maker

References

External links
 

Windows software
3D publishing